Something for Lester is an album by American jazz bassist Ray Brown recorded in 1977 and released on the Contemporary label.

Reception 
Allmusic awarded the album 3½ stars with Scott Yanow noting "This excellent trio session forms a sort of transition between bassist Ray Brown's work with the Oscar Peterson Trio and his own small-group sessions of the '80s and '90s".

Track listing
 "Ojos de Rojo" (Cedar Walton) - 5:16
 "Slippery" - 7:27 (Ray Brown)
 "Something in Common" (Walton) - 4:50
 "Love Walked In" (George Gershwin, Ira Gershwin) - 5:25
 "Georgia on My Mind" (Hoagy Carmichael, Stuart Gorrell) - 7:11
 "Little Girl Blue" (Richard Rodgers, Lorenz Hart) - 6:17
 "Sister Sadie" (Horace Silver) - 4:54

Personnel
Ray Brown - bass
Cedar Walton - piano
Elvin Jones - drums

References

Contemporary Records albums
Ray Brown (musician) albums
1978 albums